Jim the Penman may refer to:

 James Townsend Saward (1798–c. 1875), English barrister and forger
 Emanuel Ninger (1846/1847–1924), American counterfeiter
 Jim the Penman, a play by Sir Charles Lawrence Young, 7th Baronet (1839–1887)
 Jim the Penman (1915 film), an American silent film adaptation of the play, starring John B. Mason
 Jim the Penman (1921 film), an American silent film adaptation of the play, starring Lionel Barrymore

See also
 Jim Penman, Australian businessman and biohistorian
 James Penman, Scottish footballer